Fatima Yusuf-Olukoju (born 2 May 1971 in Owo, Ondo) is a retired Nigerian athlete, who competed mainly in the 400 metres during her career. She won 400 metres race in the 1991 All-Africa Games and was second in the 200 metres race. She is married to Adewale Olukoju.

She later competed in the 200 meters at the World Championship in Spain where she ran 22.28. She is also the first African woman to run under 50 secs in the 400 meters. She ran 49.43 at the 1995 African Championship

She competed for Nigeria in the 1996 Summer Olympics held in Atlanta, United States in the 400 meters in which she placed 6th with the time of 49.77 and 4 x 400 metres where she won the Silver medal with her teammates Bisi Afolabi, Charity Opara and Falilat Ogunkoya behind host nation America. She attended Azusa Pacific University.

References

External links
 
 databaseOlympics
 

1971 births
Nigerian female sprinters
Olympic athletes of Nigeria
Olympic silver medalists for Nigeria
Commonwealth Games gold medallists for Nigeria
Athletes (track and field) at the 1990 Commonwealth Games
Athletes (track and field) at the 1994 Commonwealth Games
Athletes (track and field) at the 1996 Summer Olympics
Athletes (track and field) at the 2000 Summer Olympics
Living people
Yoruba sportswomen
People from Owo
Azusa Pacific University alumni
Commonwealth Games medallists in athletics
Medalists at the 1996 Summer Olympics
Olympic silver medalists in athletics (track and field)
African Games gold medalists for Nigeria
African Games medalists in athletics (track and field)
Athletes (track and field) at the 1991 All-Africa Games
Olympic female sprinters
20th-century Nigerian women
Medallists at the 1990 Commonwealth Games
Medallists at the 1994 Commonwealth Games